Carcellia is a genus of bristle flies in the family Tachinidae. There are about 12 described species in Carcellia.

Species
These 12 species belong to the genus Carcellia:

 Carcellia caspica (Baranov, 1934) c g
 Carcellia confundens (Rondani, 1859) c g
 Carcellia dumetorum (Macquart, 1850) c
 Carcellia intermedia (Herting, 1960) c g
 Carcellia lena (Richter, 1980) c g
 Carcellia nudicauda (Mesnil, 1967) c g
 Carcellia opiter (Walker, 1849) c g
 Carcellia orientalis (Shima, 1968) c g
 Carcellia pilosa Baranov, 1931 c g
 Carcellia pollinosa Mesnil, 1941 c g
 Carcellia scutellaris Robineau-Desvoidy, 1830 c g
 Carcellia susurrans (Rondani, 1859) c g

Data sources: i = ITIS, c = Catalogue of Life, g = GBIF, b = Bugguide.net

References

Further reading

External links

 
 

Tachinidae